Consort Ji (1846 – 12 November 1905), of the Han Chinese Plain Yellow Banner Wang clan, was a consort of Xianfeng Emperor.

Life

Family background 
Consort Ji was a member of Han Chinese Plain Yellow Banner Wang clan. Her personal name was Xinghuachun (杏花春; literally: Spring Apricot; corresponding with Spring Apricot villa in Yuanmingyuan).

Father: Qingyuan, served as a guard in imperial gardens department.

Mother: Lady Wu (伍氏)

One brother:Wenyuan (文元)

Daoguang era 
Consort Ji was born in 1846. Her father and grandfather died, leaving her together with mother, lady Wu, who received only one tael monthly.

Xianfeng era 
In 1858, Lady Wang entered the Forbidden City, and was given the title of "Noble Lady Ji" (吉贵人; "ji" meaning "auspicious"). She lived under the supervision of Empress Xiaozhenxian in Zhongcui palace. Lady Wang joined a clique called "Four spring ladies" together with Noble Lady Lu, Noble Lady Xi and Noble Lady Qing. According to the "Early years of Cixi" lady Wang and Consort Yi were holding crippled Xianfeng Emperor. Once, when Noble Lady Ji was pregnant, she was walking together with Lady Yehe Nara in Imperial Garden. Lady Nara accidentally kicked lady Wang causing her a miscarriage.

Tongzhi era 
In 1861, Noble Lady Ji was promoted to "Concubine Ji" (吉嫔) together with other Four Spring ladies.

Guangxu era 
In 1875, Concubine Ji was promoted to "Consort Ji" (吉妃). Consort Ji died on 12 November 1905. She was interred at the Ding Mausoleum in Eastern Qing tombs in 1907.

Titles 
 During the reign of the Daoguang Emperor (r. 1820–1850):
 Lady Wang (from 1846)
 During the reign of the Xianfeng Emperor (r. 1850–1861):
 Noble Lady Ji (from 1858), sixth rank consort 
 During the reign of the Tongzhi Emperor (r. 1861–1875):
 Concubine Ji (from 1861), fifth rank consort 
 During the reign of the Guangxu Emperor (r. 1875–1908):
 Consort Ji (from 1875), fourth rank consort

Issue 
 As Noble Lady:
 Miscarriage (male; 1859 or 1860)

See also
 Ranks of imperial consorts in China#Qing
 Royal and noble ranks of the Qing dynasty

References 

Consorts of the Xianfeng Emperor
1864 births
1905 deaths